Dieter Strozniak (born January 14, 1955) is a German former footballer who is now a coach with Hallescher FC.

External links

International career at RSSSF

1955 births
Living people
German footballers
East German footballers
East Germany international footballers
Hallescher FC players
Association football midfielders
Sportspeople from Halle (Saale)
People from Bezirk Halle